The Gimlet Bridge is a 217-foot, single span Pegram truss railroad bridge in Blaine County, Idaho. It provides  clearance above a roadbed below.

The Gimlet Bridge was constructed in 1894. In 1914, the bridge was disassembled and relocated to Blaine County, Idaho. It crosses the Big Wood River 6 miles south of Ketchum, Idaho. This bridge served the Union Pacific from 1936 to 1981 bringing skiers on luxury trains to Sun Valley, Idaho. In 1984, the Blaine County recreation district converted the bridge to pedestrian use. In 1997, the bridge was placed on the National Register of Historic Places.

The bridge was fabricated in 1894 by the Edge Moor Bridge Works of Wilmington, Delaware.

References

Railroad bridges on the National Register of Historic Places in Idaho
Transportation in Blaine County, Idaho
Pedestrian bridges in Idaho
Rail trail bridges in the United States
Relocated buildings and structures in Idaho
National Register of Historic Places in Blaine County, Idaho
Truss bridges in the United States
Pegram trusses
Bridges completed in 1894
Union Pacific Railroad bridges